John Christensen can refer to:

 John Christensen (baseball) (born 1960), American baseball player
 John Christensen (field hockey) (born 1948), New Zealand hockey player
 John Christensen (swimmer) (1915–1996), Danish swimmer

See also
 Jon Christensen (born 1943), Norwegian jazz drummer
 Jon Christensen (historian) (active from 2012), American environmental historian, journalist, and editor
 Jon Lynn Christensen (born 1963), U.S. Representative from Nebraska